= Yohan International Christian School =

Location
- 4-30-2 Kitashinjuku Shinjuku-ku, Tokyo 169-0074; Japan; 35.7060346°N 139.6903796°E

Information
- Type: Private
- Religious affiliation: Protestant
- Established: 2006
- Closed: 2019
- Grades: 5-12
- Affiliation: Yohan Tokyo Christ Church
- Website: web.archive.org/web/20180808002636/http://yics.or.jp/

Yohan International Christian School (YICS) was a school located in Shinjuku, Tokyo, Japan.

== History ==
YICS was founded in 2006 under Yohan Tokyo Christ Church. It held its last graduation ceremony in 2019, after which it ceased all activities.
